Joseph Benjamin  (born 9 November 1976) is a Nigerian actor, model, singer, Voice-over Artist and television presenter mainly known for co-hosting MTN's Project Fame, a talent reality show, and starring in the movies Tango With Me, Mr. and Mrs., and Murder at Prime Suites. He won the African Actor of the Year award at the 2012 African Film Awards. For his role in Married but Living Single, he won the best lead actor at the 2012 Best of Nollywood Awards.

Personal life
Joseph was born on 9 November 1976, to a Kogi State indigene father and an Anambra State mother. Joseph Benjamin completed his primary school education in Benue State in the northern part of Nigeria and obtained his First School Leaving Certificate. After which he completed his secondary school education in Lagos State in the south western part of Nigeria and obtained his West African Senior School Certificate. Joseph relocated to the United States in 2016, where he currently resides. He identifies as a born-again Christian.

Career

Early career 

Joseph made his movie debut in Crossroads, in 1991 (alongside Ramsey Nouah and Sandra Achums); however, his screen debut was earlier, when he appeared at age 12 in the television program Tales by Moonlight on NTA.

Nolly breakthrough and TV personality 

Joseph has starred in several television series, including Edge of Paradise, in which he was being "crushed on" by his neighbor's daughter, and Super Story. His definite breakthrough in film came in the early 2010s, with roles in romantic-themed films such as Kiss and Tell, Tango With Me, which was nominated for five Africa Movie Awards, and Married but Living Single.  He broke typecasting in 2013 by playing a detective in the 2013 crime thriller Murder at Prime Suites (MAPS), which was inspired by an actual criminal case in Lagos, Nigeria, in which a woman was murdered by someone she met on Facebook. Shortly after completing MAPS, Joseph joined the cast of Desperate Housewives Africa, the Nigerian remake of the American hit series, playing the role of Chuka Obi, housewife Kiki Obi's wealthy and domineering husband, opposite Kehinde Bankole. He co-hosted, with Adaora Oleh, MTN Project Fame West Africa between 2009 and 2016, and has appeared in TV and radio commercials.

Singer

Having sung in a choir since his early twenties, Joseph launched a career in professional singing in 2012, collaborating with singer Sabina on the album Merry Christmas that year. A devout Christian, he has since specialized in the gospel and inspirational genre with the singles Joy in 2016 and I Pour My Love in 2020. He has stated that he considers himself a musician first and foremost. He recently dropped single and he is working on releasing an EP in 2022.

Awards and nominations

Filmography

Films

Television

References

External links
 

1976 births
Male actors from Benue State
Living people
Nigerian male film actors
20th-century Nigerian male actors
21st-century Nigerian male actors
Nigerian male television actors
Male actors in Yoruba cinema
Nigerian male models
Nigerian male singers
Nigerian television presenters